15min is one of the largest news websites in Lithuania, and is owned by Estonian media company Postimees Group. The website attracts over one million unique users per month and is led by CEO Ramūnas Šaučikovas.

15min was founded in 2005 as a free daily newspaper published in Vilnius, Kaunas, and Klaipėda and was distributed in public buses, streets, and some cafés. In December 2011, it became a weekly newspaper circulating in seven Lithuanian cities. The newspaper was closed in 2013 as the company decided to concentrate its operations on digital platforms only.

In May 2016, 15min disabled anonymous comments, starting an "Internet Hygiene" movement. In 2016, 15min introduced a paywall to ad-blockers.

15min is known for its explanatory journalism and investigative journalism and was an official partner of the Panama Papers investigation team.

In March 2019, in conjunction with the Sarajevo-based Organized Crime and Corruption Reporting Project, 15min broke a story regarding a nearly $9 billion global money laundering scheme allegedly constructed by Sberbank CIB (formerly known as "Troika Dialog"). The scheme is known as ŪkioLeaks or Troika Laundromat.

In October 2020, several reporters at the website resigned in protest against planned restructuring of the editorial team which would see several editors including Raimundas Celencevičius, the chief editor of the outlet, removed from their desks. The resigned journalists accused the management of editorial interference. 47 workers at the news portal have founded a new trade union to challenge the management.

References

External links

 

Daily newspapers published in Lithuania
2005 establishments in Lithuania
Free newspapers
Newspapers established in 2005